Mohamed Hussein Jama aka "Rambo" is a current Somaliland Member of Parliament. Jama is also founder and former editor of the Geeska Afrika newspaper.

Career 
Jama was elected in the 2021 Somaliland parliamentary election and represents the Maroodi Jeex constituency representing the Kulmiye party. Prior to his election, Jama worked as a journalist at Jamhuuriyadda and later founded the Geeska Afrika newspaper. He also served as chairman of the Center for Policy Analysis think tank based in Somaliland.

References 
Somaliland politicians
Newspaper founders
Living people
Year of birth missing (living people)